New Hanover Township is a township in Burlington County, in the U.S. state of New Jersey. As of the 2020 United States census, the township's population was 6,367, a decrease of 1,018 (−13.8%) from the 2010 census count of 7,385, which in turn reflected decline of 2,359 (−24.2%) from the 9,744 counted in the 2000 census. The township is located in the Delaware Valley.

History
New Hanover was originally formed by Royal charter on December 2, 1723, from portions of Chesterfield Township and Springfield Township. New Hanover was incorporated as one of New Jersey's initial 104 townships by an act of the New Jersey Legislature on February 21, 1798. Portions of the township were taken to form Pemberton borough (December 15, 1826), Pemberton Township (March 10, 1846), North Hanover Township (April 12, 1905) and Wrightstown (March 4, 1918).

Geography
According to the United States Census Bureau, the township had a total area of 22.56 square miles (58.42 km2), including 22.33 square miles (57.84 km2) of land and 0.22 square miles (0.58 km2) of water (0.99%).

Fort Dix is an unincorporated community and census-designated place (CDP) with a total 2010 Census population of 7,716 located in portions of New Hanover Township (5,951 of the total), Pemberton Township (1,765 of CDP's residents) and Springfield Township (with no residents in the CDP). McGuire AFB CDP is a CDP with a 2010 population of 3,710 located in portions of New Hanover Township (737 of the total) and North Hanover Township (2,973).

Cookstown is a small unincorporated community located near Fort Dix. Other unincorporated communities, localities and place names located partially or completely within the township include Cranberry Hall, Cranbury Park, Fountain Green, Lewistown, Mahalala, Pointville, Shreve and Taylors Mountain.

The township borders North Hanover Township, Pemberton Township and Wrightstown in Burlington County; and Plumsted Township in Ocean County.

The township is one of 56 South Jersey municipalities that are included within the New Jersey Pinelands National Reserve, a protected natural area of unique ecology covering , that has been classified as a United States Biosphere Reserve and established by Congress in 1978 as the nation's first National Reserve. Part of the township is included in the state-designated Pinelands Area, which includes portions of Burlington County, along with areas in Atlantic, Camden, Cape May, Cumberland, Gloucester and Ocean counties.

Demographics

2010 census

The Census Bureau's 2006–2010 American Community Survey showed that (in 2010 inflation-adjusted dollars) median household income was $63,796 (with a margin of error of +/− $9,062) and the median family income was $61,083 (+/− $9,842). Males had a median income of $33,368 (+/− $5,196) versus $38,977 (+/− $6,300) for females. The per capita income for the borough was $15,387 (+/− $1,620). About 0.7% of families and 0.7% of the population were below the poverty line, including 0.8% of those under age 18 and 8.5% of those age 65 or over.

2000 census
As of the 2000 United States census there were 9,744 people, 1,162 households, and 991 families residing in the township. The racial makeup of the township was 64.1% White, 28.9% African American, 0.4% Native American, 1.5% Asian, 0.1% Pacific Islander, 2.7% from other races, and 2.3% from two or more races. Hispanic or Latino of any race were 19.4% of the population.

There were 1,162 households, out of which 60.9% had children under the age of 18 living with them, 78.1% were married couples living together, 3.7% had a female householder with no husband present, and 14.7% were non-families. 13.7% of all households were made up of individuals, and 0.9% had someone living alone who was 65 years of age or older.  The average household size was 3.14 and the average family size was 3.46.

In the township the population was spread out, with 14.5% under the age of 18, 15.7% from 18 to 24, 55.4% from 25 to 44, 13.2% from 45 to 64, and 1.3% who were 65 years of age or older.  The median age was 32 years. For every 100 females, there were 401.8 males.  For every 100 females age 18 and over, there were 561.7 males.

The median income for a household in the township was $44,386, and the median income for a family was $45,511. Males had a median income of $26,428 versus $23,050 for females. The per capita income for the township was $12,140.  About 3.2% of families and 3.9% of the population were below the poverty line, including 3.3% of those under age 18 and 12.8% of those age 65 or over.

Government

Local government 
New Hanover Township is governed under the Township form of New Jersey municipal government, one of 141 municipalities (of the 564) statewide that use this form, the second-most commonly used form of government in the state. The Township Committee is comprised of five members, who are elected directly by the voters at-large in partisan elections to serve three-year terms of office on a staggered basis, with either one or two seats coming up for election each year as part of the November general election in a three-year cycle. At an annual reorganization meeting held in January after each election, the Township Committee selects one of its members to serve as Mayor and another as Deputy Mayor.

, the members of the New Hanover Township Committee are Mayor Paul D. Peterla (R, term on committee ends December 30, 2023; term as mayor ends 2022), Deputy Mayor Rick Koshak (R, term on committee ends 2024; term as deputy mayor ends 2022), Patrick Murphy (R, 2024), Nicholas Pawlyzyn Sr. (R, 2023) and Dennis Roohr (R, 2022).

Federal, state and county representation 
New Hanover Township is located in the 3rd Congressional District and is part of New Jersey's 12th state legislative district. Prior to the 2011 reapportionment following the 2010 Census, New Hanover Township had been in the 30th state legislative district.

 

Burlington County is governed by a Board of County Commissioners comprised of five members who are chosen at-large in partisan elections to serve three-year terms of office on a staggered basis, with either one or two seats coming up for election each year; at an annual reorganization meeting, the board selects a director and deputy director from among its members to serve a one-year term. , Burlington County's Commissioners are
Director Felicia Hopson (D, Willingboro Township, term as commissioner ends December 31, 2024; term as director ends 2023),
Deputy Director Tom Pullion (D, Edgewater Park, term as commissioner and as deputy director ends 2023),
Allison Eckel (D, Medford, 2025),
Daniel J. O'Connell (D, Delran Township, 2024) and 
Balvir Singh (D, Burlington Township, 2023). 
Burlington County's Constitutional Officers are
County Clerk Joanne Schwartz (R, Southampton Township, 2023)
Sheriff James H. Kostoplis (D, Bordentown, 2025) and 
Surrogate Brian J. Carlin (D, Burlington Township, 2026).

Politics
As of March 2011, there were a total of 689 registered voters in New Hanover Township, of which 148 (21.5% vs. 33.3% countywide) were registered as Democrats, 278 (40.3% vs. 23.9%) were registered as Republicans and 262 (38.0% vs. 42.8%) were registered as Unaffiliated. There was one voter registered to another party. Among the township's 2010 Census population, 9.3% (vs. 61.7% in Burlington County) were registered to vote, including 10.1% of those ages 18 and over (vs. 80.3% countywide).

In the 2012 presidential election, Republican Mitt Romney received 246 votes (55.2% vs. 40.2% countywide), ahead of Democrat Barack Obama with 194 votes (43.5% vs. 58.1%) and other candidates with 6 votes (1.3% vs. 1.0%), among the 446 ballots cast by the township's 742 registered voters, for a turnout of 60.1% (vs. 74.5% in Burlington County). In the 2008 presidential election, Republican John McCain received 264 votes (56.3% vs. 39.9% countywide), ahead of Democrat Barack Obama with 190 votes (40.5% vs. 58.4%) and other candidates with 3 votes (0.6% vs. 1.0%), among the 469 ballots cast by the township's 674 registered voters, for a turnout of 69.6% (vs. 80.0% in Burlington County). In the 2004 presidential election, Republican George W. Bush received 256 votes (65.3% vs. 46.0% countywide), ahead of Democrat John Kerry with 131 votes (33.4% vs. 52.9%) and other candidates with 4 votes (1.0% vs. 0.8%), among the 392 ballots cast by the township's 572 registered voters, for a turnout of 68.5% (vs. 78.8% in the whole county).

In the 2013 gubernatorial election, Republican Chris Christie received 224 votes (76.7% vs. 61.4% countywide), ahead of Democrat Barbara Buono with 57 votes (19.5% vs. 35.8%) and other candidates with 3 votes (1.0% vs. 1.2%), among the 292 ballots cast by the township's 726 registered voters, yielding a 40.2% turnout (vs. 44.5% in the county). In the 2009 gubernatorial election, Republican Chris Christie received 206 votes (59.2% vs. 47.7% countywide), ahead of Democrat Jon Corzine with 97 votes (27.9% vs. 44.5%), Independent Chris Daggett with 15 votes (4.3% vs. 4.8%) and other candidates with 10 votes (2.9% vs. 1.2%), among the 348 ballots cast by the township's 723 registered voters, yielding a 48.1% turnout (vs. 44.9% in the county).

Education 
Non-military area Public school students in pre-kindergarten through eighth grade attend the New Hanover Township School, which serves students from both New Hanover Township and Wrightstown as part of the New Hanover Township School District; portions on Joint Base McGuire-Dix-Lakehurst have separate school zoning. Students living on the base have choices of three school districts, none of them being New Hanover schools.

As of the 2018–19 school year, the New Hanover district, comprised of one school, had an enrollment of 177 students and 23.6 classroom teachers (on an FTE basis), for a student–teacher ratio of 7.5:1. In the 2016–2017 school year, the district had the 40th-smallest enrollment of any school district in the state.

For ninth through twelfth grades, students from both New Hanover Township (non-military area) and Wrightstown attend Bordentown Regional High School as part of a sending/receiving relationship with the Bordentown Regional School District, a regional K–12 school district that serves students from Bordentown City, Bordentown Township and Fieldsboro Borough. As of the 2018–19 school year, the high school had an enrollment of 770 students and 53.8 classroom teachers (on an FTE basis), for a student–teacher ratio of 14.3:1.

Students from New Hanover Township, and from all of Burlington County, are eligible to attend the Burlington County Institute of Technology, a countywide public school district that serves the vocational and technical education needs of students at the high school and post-secondary level at its campuses in Medford and Westampton Township.

Transportation

Roads and highways

New Jersey Route 68 reaches its southern terminus in New Hanover Township. County Route 545 has a gap in New Hanover due to the restricted area on the Fort Dix entity of Joint Base McGuire-Dix-Lakehurst.

Public transportation
NJ Transit provides bus service in the township on the 317 route between Asbury Park and Philadelphia.

Notable people

People who were born in, residents of, or otherwise closely associated with New Hanover Township include:

 Edward Settle Godfrey (1843–1932), United States Army Brigadier General who received the Medal of Honor for leadership as a captain during the Indian Wars

References

External links

 
 New Hanover Township Public Schools
 
 School Data for the New Hanover Township School, National Center for Education Statistics
 Bordentown Regional High School

 
1723 establishments in New Jersey
Populated places in the Pine Barrens (New Jersey)
Populated places established in 1723
Township form of New Jersey government
Townships in Burlington County, New Jersey